Season one of El Artista del Año premiered on April 28, 2018, on the América Televisión network.

On July 7, 2018, Pedro Loli was crowned the champion of the season, Micheille Soifer finished second, while Rossana Fernández-Maldonado finished third.

Cast

Contestants 
The ten contestants were presented during the first week of the show.

Hosts and judges 
Gisela Valcárcel and Jaime "Choca" Mandros were the host and the co-host, respectively. Morella Petrozzi, Lucho Cáceres, Fiorella Rodríguez and Cecilia Bracamonte were the judges. During the third week, musical director Juan Carlos Fernández replaced Bracamonte.

Scoring charts 

Red numbers indicate those sentenced for each week
Green numbers indicate the highest score for each week
 the contestant eliminated of the week
 the contestant saved in the duel
 the contestant eliminated and saved with the lifeguard
 the contestant withdrew from the competition
 the winning contestant
 the runner-up contestant
 the third-place contestant

Average score chart 
This table only counts performances scored on a 40-point scale.

Higher and lower scores 
This table has the highest and lowest scores of each contestants performance according to the 40-point scale.

Notes

References

External links 
 

Peruvian television shows